Twilight Park Historic District is a national historic district located at Haines Falls in Greene County, New York. The district contains 102 contributing buildings, one contributing site, and seven contributing structures. It is composed of two late 19th century resort communities that have been incorporated as one (and under one name) since 1935.  Twilight Park is the larger of the two, while Santa Cruz Park includes 15 remaining cottages.  The initial cottages were constructed in 1887.

It was listed on the National Register of Historic Places in 2007.

References

Historic districts on the National Register of Historic Places in New York (state)
Historic districts in Greene County, New York
National Register of Historic Places in Greene County, New York